Charcot Island or Charcot Land is an island administered under the Antarctic Treaty System,  long and  wide, which is ice covered except for prominent mountains overlooking the north coast. A notable landmark of the island is its northernmost point, Cape Byrd.

History
Charcot Island was discovered on 11 January 1910 by the French Antarctic Expedition under Jean-Baptiste Charcot, who, at the insistence of his crew and the recommendation of Edwin S. Balch and others, named it Charcot Land. He did so with the stated intention of honoring his father, Jean-Martin Charcot, a famous French physician. The insularity of Charcot Land was proved by Sir Hubert Wilkins, who flew around it on 29 December 1929.

2009 Collapse of ice bridge
The ice bridge collapsed rapidly, turning into hundreds of icebergs.

See also 
 Composite Antarctic Gazetteer
 List of Antarctic and sub-Antarctic islands
 List of Antarctic islands south of 60° S
 SCAR
 Territorial claims in Antarctica

References 

British Antarctic Territory
Islands of Antarctica